The 1975–76 Ball State Cardinals men's basketball team represented Ball State University as a member of the Mid-American Conference during the 1975–76 NCAA Division I men's basketball season.

Roster

Schedule

References 

1975–76 Mid-American Conference men's basketball season
1975–76
Ball State Cardinals men's basketball
Ball State Cardinals men's basketball